Chinese Literature, in some years Chinese Literature: Fiction, Poetry, Art, was an English-language literary magazine of Chinese literature in translation. It was founded in 1951 by Yeh Chun-chan, Sidney Shapiro, Yang Xianyi, and Gladys Yang. The headquarters was in Beijing. In 1956, Chinese Literature was incorporated into the state-run Foreign Languages Press. Publication ceased in 2000, but newer contents appeared on its website for a time.

The magazine ran quarterly from 1951 to 1957, bimonthly in 1958, monthly from 1959 to 1983, quarterly from 1984 to 1999, and bimonthly in 2000. Over 2000 writers and artists were featured in the issues.

See also
Pathlight (magazine)
Renditions (magazine)

References

External links
Archived official site

1951 establishments in China
2000 disestablishments in China
Bi-monthly magazines published in China
Chinese poetry
Defunct literary magazines
Defunct magazines published in China
English-language magazines
Literary magazines published in China
Literary translation magazines
Magazines established in 1951
Magazines disestablished in 2000
Magazines published in Beijing
Monthly magazines published in China
Quarterly magazines
Poetry literary magazines